Almir Bétemps is a former Italian luger, originally from the Aosta Valley, who competed from the mid-1980s to the early 1990s. A natural track luger, he won three medals in the men's doubles event at the FIL World Luge Natural Track Championships with two golds (1986, 1992) and a silver 1990).

Bétemps also won three medals in the men's doubles event at the FIL European Luge Natural Track Championships with one gold (1993) and two silvers (1985, 1987).

Bétemps' doubles partner during the World Luge Natural Track Championships was Corrado Hérin.  Bétemps posted a moving tribute to Hérin after the latter's untimely death in an ultraflight plane accident on March 31, 2019.

References

Natural track European Championships results 1970-2006.
Natural track World Championships results: 1979-2007

Italian male lugers
Living people
Year of birth missing (living people)
Italian lugers
Sportspeople from Aosta Valley